The Paynauen Duyan Festival is an annual festival in the Municipality of Iba, Zambales in the Philippines. The festival was first held in 2005.

Etymology

Paynauen a word of Zambal origin, literally means Pahingahan. Duyan is a local name for hammock, a favorite spot for resting and relaxing.

Events and Highlights
 Binibining Paynauen
 Street Dancing and Duyan Parade Competition
 Little Miss Fashionista
 Color My World Fun Run
 Balik Tanaw Exhibit
 Iba Got Talent

References

Festivals in the Philippines
Culture of Zambales